Broad–Kenan Streets Historic District is a national historic district located at Wilson, Wilson County, North Carolina.  It encompasses 293 contributing buildings in a predominantly residential section of Wilson.  The district developed between about 1890 to 1940 and includes notable examples of Colonial Revival, Bungalow / American Craftsman, and Queen Anne style architecture.  Notable buildings include the Woman's Club of Wilson (1922).

It was listed on the National Register of Historic Places in 1988.

References

Historic districts on the National Register of Historic Places in North Carolina
Colonial Revival architecture in North Carolina
Queen Anne architecture in North Carolina
Geography of Wilson County, North Carolina
National Register of Historic Places in Wilson County, North Carolina